Cole Stevenson, known by the stage name Merkules, is a Canadian rapper from Surrey, British Columbia. He is known for his "hangover-rap" style of music.

Career
Stevenson began rapping at age 15 under the name Merk Mikz. He met Snak the Ripper at a concert, and Stevenson subsequently joined his tour as a hype man. In 2011, the two began collaborating on music.

At the age of 16, Stevenson was randomly attacked while walking home at night. He received permanent facial scars after being beaten and stabbed. No arrests were made. His 2016 album Scars drew inspiration from the event.

In 2017, Stevenson released the album Trust Your Gut. He followed it in 2018 with the album Cole. Stevenson was set to tour with Gucci Mane in May 2019 before dropping out. His album Special Occasion was released in October of that year. The song "Bass" from the album was featured in the 2020 video game Tony Hawk's Pro Skater 1 + 2.

In 2020, Stevenson released the album Apply Pressure through his label Merkules Music and BMG. He was subsequently featured on the talk show of Dr. Phil. 
In 2022, Merkules released the single "I'm Here" on Death Row Records.

Discography
List adapted from Spotify on September 28, 2022.
Studio albums
Apply Pressure (2020)
Force of Habit  (2020)
Special Occasion (2019)
Cole (2018)
Trust Your Gut (2017)
Scars (2014)
Hunger Pains (2013)
Bacon Bits (2012)
Canadian Bacon (2012)

References

21st-century Canadian rappers
People from Surrey, British Columbia
Canadian male rappers